Batasan Road (formerly and still known as IBP Road), is a six-to-ten lane circumferential highway located in the barangays of Batasan Hills, Bagong Silangan, Payatas, and Commonwealth, which are located all in Quezon City, Philippines. The road serves as a route towards the Batasang Pambansa Complex, where the House of Representatives of the Philippines is located.

Route description 

The road begins at the intersection with Commonwealth Avenue near the Sandiganbayan and the terminal of the Batasan Tricycle Operators and Drivers Association (BATODA) as a 6-lane highway. A tunnel named the Batasan Tunnel, completed in 2001, is used by southbound motorists turning left towards Commonwealth Avenue. The road then continues towards the intersection with the Filinvest 1 Road which connects the road towards the Filinvest 1 Subdivision. The road continues as a 10-lane highway which was completed in 2008, passing towards the Batasan Hills National High School and the South Gate of the Batasang Pambansa which was used as an entrance for visitors until the 2007 Batasang Pambansa bombing where only House Members can use the entrance. At the intersection with the Batasan–San Mateo Road, the road returns into a 6-lane highway and passes towards the Civil Service Commission, the Department of Social Welfare and Development, and the North Gate of the Batasang Pambansa which is now used as entrance for the media, visitors, and House employees. The road then passes through homes located along the Payatas area and after the intersection with Payatas Road (Manila Gravel Pit Road), the road ends in the Litex area and rejoins with Commonwealth Avenue.

Buildings and structures 
The road has a lot of major government establishments like the Batasang Pambansa Complex where the House of Representatives is located, Sandiganbayan, Commission on Audit, Department of Social Welfare and Development, and both House and Senate Electoral Tribunals. There are other major establishments located within the whole stretch of the avenue like the Batasan Hills Super Health Center which serves the five barangays of Batasan Hills, Commonwealth, Payatas, Holy Spirit and Bagong Silangan is located within the avenue. Also Police Station 6 of the Quezon City Police Department is located adjacent to the South Entrance of the Batasang Pambansa Complex, Also most of the avenue is surrounded by homes which are crammed and small but there are some residential subdivisions along the area. The Batasan Hills National High School is also located in the avenue. Also the Batasan Tricycle Operators and Drivers Association (BATODA) has its main terminal adjacent with the Sandiganbayan.

References 

Streets in Quezon City